Two-time defending champions Alfie Hewett and Gordon Reid defeated Gustavo Fernández and Shingo Kunieda in the final, 6–2, 4–6, [10–7] to win the men's doubles wheelchair tennis title at the 2022 Australian Open.

Seeds

Draw

Bracket

References

External links
 Drawsheet on ausopen.com

Wheelchair Men's Doubles
2022 Men's Doubles